Dame Elan Closs Stephens  ( Roberts; born 16 June 1948) is a Welsh educator and Wales' representative on the BBC Board. She specialises in cultural and broadcasting policy. She also serves as a non-executive director of the Welsh Government's Board, led by the Permanent Secretary. She is Pro Chancellor of Aberystwyth University.

Born in Talysarn in the Nantlle Valley, Gwynedd to William Jones Roberts and Mair ( Closs) Roberts, she was educated at Ysgol Dyffryn Nantlle and Somerville College, Oxford.

Stephens is Emeritus Professor of Communications and Creative Industries at Aberystwyth University’s Department of Theatre Film and Television. She also acts as Director of Enterprise and Knowledge Transfer to enable research projects with industry partners. In 2020, she was appointed Pro Chancellor of Aberystwyth University.

In 1998, the Department for Culture Media and Sport appointed Stephens chair of the S4C Authority, which was renewed for a second term until 2006. She was a Governor of the British Film Institute until 2007, and chair of its Audit and Governance during the refurbishment of the Southbank Centre National Film Theatre. She chaired the Wales Advisory Committee of the British Council until 2011, and was a board member of the Film Agency for Wales, and a trustee/board member of Arts & Business.

After chairing Chwarae Teg, a body that promotes the economic development of women in Wales, in 2009 she was appointed by the Welsh Assembly Government's Minister for Social Justice and Local Government to chair the Recovery Board for Isle of Anglesey County Council. In 2006, she chaired the Stephens Report on the financing and structure of the arts in Wales for the Welsh Assembly Government. A member of the Welsh Assembly Government's Strategic Delivery Performance Board, in October 2010 she was appointed a member for Wales of the BBC Trust.

Stephens was appointed Commander of the Order of the British Empire (CBE) in the 2001 Birthday Honours for services to broadcasting and the Welsh Language and Dame Commander of the Order of the British Empire (DBE) in the 2019 Birthday Honours for services to the Welsh Government and broadcasting.

She was appointed High Sheriff of Dyfed for 2012/13.

Family
Elan Closs Roberts married
Roy Stephens on 23 September 1972. He died in 1989. She has two children.

References

External links
Bio at Aberystwyth University
Bio at the Welsh Assembly Government

1948 births
Living people
People from Gwynedd
Alumni of Somerville College, Oxford
Fellows of Somerville College, Oxford
Academics of Aberystwyth University
Welsh civil servants
Dames Commander of the Order of the British Empire
High Sheriffs of Dyfed
British women academics
Welsh-speaking academics
BBC Board members
21st-century Welsh educators
20th-century Welsh educators
20th-century women educators
21st-century women educators